WKYZ (101.7 FM) is a radio station broadcasting an adult album alternative format. Licensed to Key Colony Beach, Florida, United States, the station serves the Florida Keys area.  The station is currently owned by Keys Media Company, Inc.

History

The station went on the air as WKKB on May 11, 1989.  On November 2, 1998, the station changed its call sign to the current WKYZ.  It has broadcast a classic rock format in the past. On May 1, 2009, WKYZ returned to the air (after two months of silence) with talk, simulcasting WFFG 1300 AM Marathon, Florida. On August 7, 2011, the simulcast with WFFG ended and the station adopted a AAA format with the branding "The New Pirate Radio 101.7 FM".

References

External links

KYZ
Radio stations established in 1989
1989 establishments in Florida